Samuel D. Kassow (born 1946) is an American historian of the history of Ashkenazi Jewry.

Early life 
Kassow was born in a displaced persons' camp in Stuttgart, Germany. His mother survived because a classmate hid her and her sister in a dug-out underneath the barn on his family's farm; his father was arrested by the Russians and spent the duration of the war in a Soviet prison camp. 
Kassow grew up in New Haven, Connecticut.

Education 
In 1966, Kassow earned his B.A. from Trinity College, Hartford, Connecticut. In 1968, Kassow earned a M.Sc. from the London School of Economics. In 1976, Kassow earned a Ph.D. from Princeton University.

Career 
Kassow was the Charles Northam Professor at Trinity College for many years.

Kassow was a consultant to the Museum of History of the Polish Jews, which opened on the site of the Warsaw Ghetto, and was responsible for two of the eight core exhibitions.

In his book, Who Will Write Our History? Rediscovering a Hidden Archive From the Warsaw Ghetto, Kassow speaks about the importance of preserving historical documents and the past. He describes the historical events going on during World War II in the 1940s that affected and eventually eliminated the Warsaw Ghetto. His main focus is the Ringelblum Archive created in absolute secrecy by a small group of people that lived in the Warsaw Ghetto which were uncovered and studied about ten years later.

In 2014, Indiana University Press and the United States Holocaust Museum published The Clandestine History of the Kovno Jewish Ghetto Police, with an introduction by Kassow.

His 2007 book Who Will Write Our History was adapted into a documentary film of the same title, directed by Roberta Grossman and produced by Nancy Spielberg. It was released in 2018.

Books and articles 
 Students, Professors, and the State inTsarist Russia: 1884-1917, University of California Press, 1989. .
 Between Tsar and People: the Search for a Public Identity in Tsarist Russia. Edith Clowes, Samuel Kassow, James L. West eds. Princeton University Press, Princeton, NJ 1991. .
 The Distinctive Life of East European Jewry, YIVO, New York 2004
 Who will Write our History: Emanuel Ringelblum and the Oyneg Shabes Archive, Indiana University Press, 2007
 The Holocaust in The Cambridge History of Judaism Vol VIII pages 633-671, Cambridge University Press, 2018

Personal life 
Kassow is married to Lisa Pleskow Kassow. She is a director of Zach's Hillel at Trinity College.

References

External links 
 
 Samuel Kassow's Who Will Write Our History? - Review by Clara Weiss

Jewish historians
Historians of Ashkenazi Jewry
21st-century American historians
21st-century American male writers
Trinity College (Connecticut) alumni
Princeton University alumni
Alumni of the London School of Economics
Trinity College (Connecticut) faculty
1946 births
Living people
Writers from New Haven, Connecticut
American people of Polish-Jewish descent
Jewish American historians
Historians from Connecticut
American male non-fiction writers
21st-century American Jews
American Ashkenazi Jews